The Prager Zeitung was a German newspaper in the Czech Republic issued weekly in Prague; it now publishes online only.

History and profile
Prager Zeitung was founded in 1991. It considers itself as a successor of the Prager Tagblatt, a German-language daily in Bohemia published from 1876 to 1939. 

Prager Zeitung, published by Prago Media spol, is an independent publication and has a liberal political leaning. It provides political news and puts special emphasis on the relations between the Czech Republic and its German-speaking neighbors. Its former editors include Egon Erwin Kisch and Max Brod.

The weekly is also distributed in Germany, Austria and Switzerland. It is the largest non-Czech newspaper published in the Czech Republic.

See also
 Germans in the Czech Republic
 Deutsche Schule Prag

References

External links
 Prager Zeitung online

1991 establishments in Czechoslovakia
German diaspora in the Czech Republic
Publications established in 1991
Weekly newspapers published in the Czech Republic
German-language newspapers published in the Czech Republic
Newspapers published in Prague